Sue Ryder is a British palliative, neurological and bereavement support charity based in the United Kingdom. Formed as The Sue Ryder Foundation in 1953 by World War II Special Operations Executive volunteer Sue Ryder, the organisation provides care and support for people living with terminal illnesses and neurological conditions, as well as individuals who are coping with a bereavement. The charity was renamed Sue Ryder Care in 1996, before adopting its current name in 2011.

Care centres

Sue Ryder supports people living with life-limiting and long-term conditions including brain injury, cancer, dementia, strokes, multiple sclerosis, Huntington's disease, Parkinson's disease and motor neuron disease. It operates specialist palliative care centres, care centres for people with complex conditions, homecare services and a growing number of community-based services. The charity also offers support to people who have suffered a bereavement, through face-to-face services in its centres and also as an online service, as part of a bespoke Online Bereavement Community and Online Bereavement Counselling Service. Sue Ryder hospices and neurological care centres are currently operated in the following areas:

Aberdeen, Scotland: Dee View Court (neurological care centre)
Cheltenham, Gloucestershire: Leckhampton Court Hospice (palliative care centre)
Lancashire: Sue Ryder Neurological Care Centre, Lancashire (neurological care centre)
Ipswich, Suffolk: The Chantry (neurological care centre)
Leeds, West Yorkshire: Wheatfields Hospice (palliative care centre)
Moggerhanger, Bedfordshire: St John's Hospice (palliative care centre)
South Oxfordshire: South Oxfordshire Palliative Care Hub (palliative care centre)
Oxenhope, West Yorkshire: Manorlands Hospice (palliative care centre)
Peterborough, Cambridgeshire: Thorpe Hall Hospice (palliative care centre)
Reading, Berkshire: Duchess of Kent Hospice (palliative care centre)
St Paul's Walden, Hertfordshire: Stagenhoe (neurological care centre)

The charity also provides home-based neurological care in Stirling.

Fundraising

Sue Ryder's income was £53.9 million during the year ending 31 March 2020, which included £29.7 million from NHS and local authority funding, and £22 million from fundraising campaigns and retail sales (both online and in the charity's 400 shops). The income was used for providing 2.2 million hours of care to people in the UK. In addition to full-time staff, the charity currently has more than 10,000 volunteers supporting its work across the UK. Volunteering roles cover many areas of the charity's work, including administration, catering, transport, gardening, fundraising, finance, retail, photography, events coordination, cleaning, research, befriending and bereavement support.

Sue Ryder launched its Prisoner Volunteer Programme in 2006. It works with around 40 prisons nationwide offering work experience in 100 locations, including offices, shops and warehouses. The programme has won a number of awards, including the Education and Training award at Civil Society's Charity Awards in 2013. In 2014, the charity opened a shop in Slough which offered staff roles to homeless people in partnership with the organisation Slough Homeless Our Concern.

Controversy
In February 2013, Sue Ryder was criticised alongside other charitable organisations for taking part in the UK Government's workfare scheme, in which people living on benefits were instructed to attend unpaid work at various companies and charities, at the risk of otherwise losing their benefits. After enlisting "around 1,000" volunteers as part of the scheme, Sue Ryder later promised a "phased withdrawal" due to online protests. The charity later released a statement explaining that they had chosen to withdraw in order to "protect staff from an online campaign of harassment".

See also
Leonard Cheshire Disability

References

External links

Official website
Sue Ryder, registered charity no. 1052076 at the Charity Commission for England and Wales
Sue Ryder, registered charity no. SC039578 at the Office of the Scottish Charity Regulator

1953 establishments in the United Kingdom
Health charities in the United Kingdom
Organizations established in 1953
Social care in the United Kingdom